Zaila Rowena McCalla, O.J. (née Morris; born 31 January 1948) is a Jamaican judge. Between 2007 and 2018, she was the Chief Justice of Jamaica.

Early life and education
Zaila Rowena Morris was born on 31 January 1948 in Westmoreland Parish, Jamaica. She is one of six children of Herbert and Beryl Morris. She was educated at Chantilly All-Age School in Westmoreland, and at Montego Bay High School, an all-girls secondary school in Montego Bay. She studied law at the University of the West Indies, graduating with a Bachelor of Laws (LLB Hons) degree. She then attended Norman Manley Law School, where she completed a Legal Education Certificate (LEC).

Legal career
McCalla was called to the bar on 27 September 1976. She served as a Deputy Clerk of Court from October 1976 to November 1977, and as a Clerk of Court from November 1977 to July 1980. On 1 July 1980, she joined the Department of Public Prosecutions as a Crown Counsel. In 1985, she served as acting Assistant Director of Public Prosecutions.

Judiciary
In August 1985, McCalla was appointed a Resident Magistrate. She was promoted to Senior Resident Magistrate in 1996. From 1993 to 1996, she was also an acting Master in Chambers of the Supreme Court. In August 1996, she became a Master in Chambers, serving from 1996 to 1997.

On 7 July 1997, McCalla was appointed a Puisne Judge of the Supreme Court. She stood down from that appointment on 10 April 2006, when she was appointed a Judge of Appeal. In 2006, she was also an Acting Judge of the Grand Court of the Cayman Islands.

On 27 June 2007, McCalla was appointed the Chief Justice of Jamaica. As such, she is Jamaica's most senior judge and head of its judiciary. She is the first woman to hold that appointment.

Personal life
McCalla has been married twice. She was first married to Adolph Holness but their marriage was later dissolved. In 1981, she married William McCalla. William is an Attorney-at-Law. She has three children; two sons and one daughter.

McCalla is an Anglican and attends the Church of St. Margaret, Liguanea, an Anglo-Catholic parish. On 1 July 2014, she was appointed the Chancellor of the Diocese of Jamaica and the Cayman Islands. In that role, she advises the bishop and the Diocese on matters of Canon Law.

Honours
In 2007, McCalla was awarded the Order of Jamaica (OJ), and is therefore styled The Honourable. On 9 February 2016, she was made an Honorary Bencher of the Middle Temple, one of the English Inns of Court.

References

1948 births
Living people
20th-century Jamaican judges
Chief justices of Jamaica
University of the West Indies alumni
People associated with the Norman Manley Law School
Jamaican women judges
21st-century Jamaican judges
Jamaican Anglicans
Members of the Order of Jamaica
Women chief justices
People from Westmoreland Parish
20th-century women judges
21st-century women judges